Acropora jacquelineae is a species of acroporid coral found in the eastern Indian Ocean and the central and western  Pacific Ocean. It can be found offshore of Indonesia, Malaysia, Papua New Guinea, the Samoan Islands, and the Solomon Islands. It was described by Carden Wallace in 1994.

Description
Its axial corallites are delicate and curved, which makes colonies of the species have an appearance similar to moss. Radial corallites are not present on this uncommon species, which is either pinkish or grey-brown in colour. It has similar features to Acropora paniculata.

Distribution
It is classed as a vulnerable species on the IUCN Red List and it is believed that its population is decreasing; the species is also listed under Appendix II of CITES. Figures of its population are unknown, but is likely to be threatened by the global reduction of coral reefs, the increase of temperature causing coral bleaching, climate change, human activity, the crown-of-thorns starfish (Acanthaster planci) and disease. It occurs in the eastern Indian Ocean and the central and western  Pacific Ocean.

Taxonomy
It was described by Carden Wallace in 1994 as Acropora jacquelineae.

References

Acropora
Cnidarians of the Indian Ocean
Cnidarians of the Pacific Ocean
Fauna of Oceania
Fauna of Southeast Asia
Marine fauna of Asia
Vulnerable animals
Vulnerable fauna of Asia
Vulnerable fauna of Oceania
Animals described in 1994